Mark Longwell (born 1960 in Stamford, Connecticut) is an American retired soccer defender who played professionally in the North American Soccer League and United Soccer League.

Career

Youth and College
Longwell played high school soccer at Trumbull High School in Trumbull, Connecticut where he a two-time All-State selection. He then played college soccer for Fairfield University where he was named All New England and the Tri-State Conference MVP in his junior and senior years. Longwell played with Slough Town FC in Slough, England in 1978, trained with Liverpool F.C. in the summer of 1980, and trained with Chelsea FC in the summer of 1982.

Professional
Longwell played for Slough Town F.C. in 1978 in the English Isthmian League. After Fairfield, Longwell had multiple tryouts at the professional level. He then signed with the Tampa Bay Rowdiesof the North American Soccer League. He made his professional debut on August 5, 1983 against the Chicago Sting, in a 4–3 win. He also played for the 1983–84 Tampa Bay Rowdies Indoor team. On April 3, 1984, Longwell signed with the Fort Lauderdale Sun of the newly established United Soccer League. The Sun went on to win the 1984 USL championship with Longwell as captain. After retirement from the game he loved, Mark settled down and had a great family including three kids with his wife Catherine. His claim to fame, however, is that he has Kirk Atamian as a son-in-law.

International
Longwell was a member of the United States men's national soccer team B Team which toured Malaysia and Singapore in 1983.

Running and Cycling
After professional soccer, Longwell turned to running and triathlons, competing in over 300 races, including 56 marathons/ultramarathons.

He has a PR of 3:13 for the marathon, 4:29 for 50K, 8:06 for 50 miles and 22 hours, 6 minutes for 100 miles in the Vermont 100 Mile Endurance Run in 1996. Longwell also has a personal best in the Ironman triathlon of 11:36 in the 1993 Ironman Canada race in Penticton, British Columbia, Canada.

Along the way, Longwell raced in marathons/ultras in 9 different countries.

In 2004, he competed in the Race Across America bike race in the two man division with John Delia of Middletown, CT. The team crossed the USA (3000 miles- San Diego to Atlantic City) in 8 days, 15 hours and 42 minutes to finish in third place in their division.

He completed his 100,000th documented lifetime cycling mile on Thanksgiving Day, 2012. Additionally, Mark has averaged 13,000 miles per year since 2012 and rode 16,025 miles in 2015- his highest annual total to date.  As of March, 2018, Longwell has ridden over 173,000 miles lifetime.

In June 2018, Longwell competed in the Race Across the West, a 925 solo non stop race from Oceanside CA to Durango CO. Unfortunately, due to injuries, he withdrew at mile 405.

On October 27, 2018 Longwell participated in the World 6,12 and 24 hour time trial championships in Borrego Springs, CA and finished 6th out of 13 in his age group in the 12 hour division with 212.4 miles covered (342 kilometers).

On November 2, 2019, Longwell participated again in the World 6,12 and 24 hour time trial championships in Borrego Springs, CA.  Total mileage this time was 222.0 - a 9.6 mile increase over 2018- and this was good for 4th place in the 50-59 age group.

Mark completed his 200,000th lifetime mile on the bike in November 2019.  In November 2021, Mark passed 238,900 miles lifetime (the distance to the moon).  The return trip will take some time.........

In July 2022, Mark passed 250,000 lifetimes miles....

References

External links
 Tampa Bay Rowdies Appreciation Blog: Mark Longwell 1983; 1984
 Rowdies Memorabilia – Mark Longwell's Game Worn Jerseys
 NASL stats

1960 births
Living people
American soccer players
American expatriate soccer players
Fort Lauderdale Sun players
Fairfield Stags men's soccer players
North American Soccer League (1968–1984) indoor players
North American Soccer League (1968–1984) players
Sportspeople from Hartford, Connecticut
Soccer players from Connecticut
Slough Town F.C. players
Tampa Bay Rowdies (1975–1993) players
United States men's international soccer players
Sportspeople from Stamford, Connecticut
Association football defenders